Opisthoteuthis mero is a species of cirrate octopus from demersal habitats surrounding New Zealand. O. mero is the most documented New Zealand Opisthoteuthis species, with over 100 reference specimens.

Distribution and habitat 
The type locality of O. mero is: 36°52'S, 176°19'E, 510 m, on the northern end of New Zealand. This species was originally found in virtually all waters surrounding New Zealand.

Conservation
O. mero is listed as Endangered by the IUCN due to the effects of commercial deep-water trawling upon population size. Prior to 1998, Opisthoteuthis species were common bycatch species from scampi fisheries in the Bay of Plenty and Auckland Islands. The longevity of Opisthoteuthis species along with their low fecundity and slow growth (primarily within embryonic development which may take 1.4-2.6 years among other species in the genus) have made many species easily susceptible to precipitous population declines, and slow recoveries.

References

Cephalopods of Oceania
Endemic fauna of New Zealand
Endemic molluscs of New Zealand
Molluscs of New Zealand
Molluscs of the Pacific Ocean
Molluscs described in 1999
Octopuses